Forselius is a surname. It may refer to:

 Bengt Gottfried Forselius (c. 1660–1688), Estonian scholar
 Johann Forselius (d. 1684), Estonian scholar
 Sten Forselius (1890–1937), Swedish Olympic athlete
 Emil Forselius (1974–2010), Swedish actor
 Jesper Forselius, first drummer of the Swedish band The Kristet Utseende

References

Surnames of Swedish origin